Two Japanese destroyers have been named Nowaki:

 , a  launched in 1906 and stricken in 1924
 , a  launched in 1940 and sunk in 1944

Imperial Japanese Navy ship names
Japanese Navy ship names